Azim (1937 – 26 March 2003) was a Bangladeshi film actor. He is best known for his role in Rupban (1965) as Rahim Badshah opposite Sujata.

Career
Azim was born on 23 July 1937 in Habiganj, Bangladesh as 'Nurul Azim Rauf Khaled'. He debuted in the 1960 film Rajdhanir Buke. In 1961, he appeared in Harano Din. He appeared in cult hit Rupban in 1965. Later, he appeared in several films in the 1960s and 1970s. Banglar Nayok was his last film. He appeared in a total of 53 movies.

Personal life
Azim married actress Sujata on 30 June 1967.

Works
 Rajdhanir Buke (1960)
 Harano Din (1961)
 Natun Sur (1962)
 Paise (1962)
 Bewaqoof (1962)
 Rupban (1965)
 Mala (1965)
 Chena Ochena (1967)
 Beder Meye (1969)
 Tansen (1970)
 Santan (1970)
 Mishor Kumari (1970)
 Takar Khela (1974)
 Protinidhi (1976)
 Banglar Nayok (1995)

References

External links
 

1937 births
2003 deaths
Bangladeshi male film actors
Bengali male actors
People from Habiganj District
20th-century Bangladeshi male actors